Lopburi City Football Club is a Thailand semi professional football club based in Lopburi Province. The club is currently playing in the Thai League 3 Western region.

Stadium and locations

Season by season domestic record

Honours

Domestic leagues
 Provincial League:
 Winners (1) : 2007

Domestic cups
 Thailand FA Cup:
 Winners (1) : 1984

References

External links 
 Official Website of Lopburi City FC
 Official Facebookpage of Lopburi City FC

Association football clubs established in 1980
Football clubs in Thailand
Lopburi province
1980 establishments in Thailand